The Kotuy is a river in Krasnoyarsk Krai, Russia. It is one of the two rivers that form the Khatanga; the other one being the Kheta.

It freezes up in late September or early October and breaks up in late May or early June.

Course
The Kotuy has its source in the Putorana Mountains and flows north, cutting from the south across the western side of the Anabar Plateau. 
After leaving the plateau area it flows northwestwards until the confluence with the Kheta to form the Khatanga, a little distance upstream from Khatanga town.

Its main tributaries are the Moyero, the Tukalan, the Eriyechka, the Changada, and the Kotuykan, which has its source in the highest part of the Anabar Plateau. Lake Yessey is part of the river basin.

See also
List of rivers of Russia

References

Rivers of Krasnoyarsk Krai
North Siberian Lowland